Villaobispo de Otero is a municipality located in the province of León, Castile and León, Spain. According to the 2004 census (INE), the municipality has a population of 665 inhabitants.

Villaobispo is part of the historical region of La Cepeda.

Villages
Brimeda
Carneros
La Carrera de Otero
Otero de Escarpizo
Sopeña de Carneros
Villaobispo

References

External links 
La Maragatería y Cepeda

Municipalities in the Province of León
La Cepeda